Dyrk jorden! (Cultivate the Soil!) is a Norwegian black-and-white feature film from 1936 written and directed by Alf Rød. It was his only feature film. It was a propaganda film produced for the Norwegian Grain Corporation.

Cast
 Reidar Borgeli as Trond 
 Ragna Breda as Guri 
 Arnfinn Brodersen as Bjarne Engset, Ola's son
 Nils Hald as Hjalmar 
 Julie Lampe as Øverli 
 Gerd Løwlie as Åse, a servant girl
 Einar Vaage as Ola Engset

References

External links
 Dyrk jorden! at the National Library of Norway

1936 films
Norwegian black-and-white films
Norwegian silent films